The 22159 / 22160 Mumbai Chhatrapati Shivaji Maharaj Terminus–Chennai Central Express is an Indian Railways train which travels between Chhatrapati Shivaji Maharaj Terminus, Mumbai and Puratchi Thalaivar Dr M.G. Ramachandran Central Railway Station , Chennai. It was converted into superfast express from 1 July 2020 and the train number was changed to 22159 for Mumbai–Chennai and 22160 for the Chennai–Mumbai instead of 11041/42.

History
The  Bombay-Madras line was laid in stages between 1858 and 1871. The present Madras-Bombay Ex­presses were running as Madras-Bom­bay Fast passenger trains from 1-12-1921  to 28-2-1930. These  trains were converted into  Express trains with effect from 1-3-1930.

Route
 Puratchi Thalaivar Dr. M.G. Ramachandran Central Railway Station 
Arakkonam Junction
Tiruttani 
Puttur
Renigunta Junction
Koduru
Razampeta
Kadapa
Yerraguntla Junction
Tadipatri
Gooty Junction
Guntakal Junction
Adoni
Mantralayam Road
Raichur
Yadgir
Wadi Junction
Kalaburagi Junction
Solapur
Kurduvadi Junction
Daund Junction
Pune Junction
Khadki
Lonavala
Kalyan Junction
Dadar
Chhatrapati Shivaji Maharaj Terminus

Coach composition

The train consists of:
 1 AC Two Tier 
 4 AC Three Tier
 8 Sleeper class
 2 General Unreserved
 1 Railway Mail Service coach
 2 Sitting cum Luggage Rakes

Traction

Operation

It runs on a daily basis.

Rake sharing

It shares its rakes with 11057/11058 Mumbai CSMT–Amritsar Express.

Gallery

References

External links
Route map and time-table of Chennai–Mumbai Express

Transport in Mumbai
Transport in Chennai
Express trains in India
Rail transport in Tamil Nadu
Rail transport in Maharashtra
Rail transport in Karnataka
Rail transport in Telangana